The Mainichi Hai (Japanese 毎日杯) is a Grade 3 horse race for three-year-old Thoroughbreds run in March over a distance of 1800 metres at Hanshin Racecourse.

The race was first run in 1954 and has held Grade 3 status since 1984. It was initially run over 2000 metres before being cut to its current distance in 2007. Past winners of the race have included Oguri Cap, T M Opera O, King Kamehameha, Kizuna and Blast Onepiece.

Winners since 2000

Earlier winners

 1984 - Marubutsu Sir Pen
 1985 - New Fun Fun
 1986 - Fresh Voice
 1987 - Daigo Alpha
 1988 - Oguri Cap
 1989 - Star Sunshine
 1990 - Key Minobu
 1991 - Iide Satan
 1992 - Hishi Masaru
 1993 - Cyclennon Sheriff
 1994 - Merci Stage
 1995 - Daitaku Teio
 1996 - Taiki Fortune
 1997 - T M Top Dan
 1998 - Miracle Time
 1999 - T M Opera O

See also
 Horse racing in Japan
 List of Japanese flat horse races

References

Turf races in Japan